The 2019 Union Budget of India was presented by Finance Minister, Nirmala Sitharaman on 5 July 2019, 11 am as her maiden budget. This was the first budget of Narendra Modi led NDA government second term.

See also
Union budget of India
2019 Interim-Union budget of India

References

External links 
 "Budget 2019: Expectations, likely announcements by Sitharaman on 5 July"
 "Budget 2019: Want to reduce your tax outgo?"

Union budgets of India
2019 in Indian economy
2019 government budgets
Modi administration